Peiyuanqiao station is a subway station in Kaifu District, Changsha, Hunan, China, operated by the Changsha subway operator Changsha Metro.

History 
It entered revenue service on June 28, 2016. The station opened on 28 June 2016.

Layout

Surrounding area
 Changsha Zhounan Experimental School, Mingde School, Yingpanlu School

References

Railway stations in Hunan
Railway stations in China opened in 2016